John Riggi is an American television writer, producer, director, and actor who has worked on various television shows.  He is from Cincinnati, Ohio.  He attended high school at Elder High School, in Cincinnati, OH.

He has worked as a writer on the NBC comedy series 30 Rock. He was nominated for the Writers Guild of America Award for Best Comedy Series at the February 2009 ceremony for his work on the third season of 30 Rock.

Writing work 
 Corn & Peg (2019)
 Camping (2018)
 American Woman (2018)
 The Comeback
 Super Fun Night (2013-2014)
 30 Rock (2006-2013)
 The Bernie Mac Show (2004)
 Charlie Lawrence (2003)
 My Guide to Becoming a Rock Star (2002)
 Family Guy (1999)
 Five Houses (1998)
 The Larry Sanders Show (1993-1997)
 The 1994 Billboard Music Awards (1994)
 The 46th Annual Primetime Emmy Awards (1994)
 1993 MTV Movie Awards (1993)
 The 45th Annual Primetime Emmy Awards (1993) 
 The Dennis Miller Show (1992)
 One Night Stand (1992)

References

External links

American television writers
American male television writers
Living people
Year of birth missing (living people)
Writers Guild of America Award winners
Place of birth missing (living people)
American gay writers
American LGBT screenwriters